Ortholepis vacciniella is a species of snout moth described by Friederike Lienig and Philipp Christoph Zeller in 1847. It is found in Germany, Denmark, Poland, the Baltic region, Russia and Fennoscandia.

The wingspan is 12–18 mm.

The larvae feed on Vaccinium and Betula nana.

References

Moths described in 1847
Phycitini
Moths of Europe